Dehliyan (also Romanized as Dehlīyān) is a village in Rudkhaneh Rural District, Rudkhaneh District, Rudan County, Hormozgan Province, Iran. At the 2006 census, its population was 107, in 23 families.

References 

Populated places in Rudan County